Komyshuvakha may refer to the following Ukrainian localities:

 Komyshuvakha, Amvrosiivka Raion, Donetsk Oblast, village in Amvrosiivka Raion
 Komyshuvakha, Kramatorsk Raion, Donetsk Oblast, an urban-type settlement in Kramatorsk Raion
 Komyshuvakha, Volnovakha Raion, Donetsk Oblast, rural settlement in Volnovakha Raion
 Komyshuvakha, Lutuhyne Raion, Luhansk Oblast, rural settlement in Lutuhyne Raion
 Komyshuvakha, Sievierodonetsk Raion, Luhansk Oblast, an urban-type settlement in Luhansk Oblast
 Komyshuvakha, Zaporizhzhia Oblast, an urban-type settlement in Zaporizhzhia Oblast